Cara Black and Rennae Stubbs were the defending champions, but both chose not to compete that year.

Anna-Lena Grönefeld and Shahar Pe'er won the title, defeating Maria Elena Camerin and Gisela Dulko 6–1, 6–4 in the final.

Seeds

Results

Draw

References

External links
 Main and Qualifying draw

Doubles
Bank of the West Classic